Dzüleke is a village in Kohima District of Nagaland state of India. The total population of the village is about 156,they have about 35 household.

References

Villages in Kohima district